Trupanea propinqua is a species of tephritid or fruit flies in the genus Trupanea of the family Tephritidae. The species can be found in Peru.

References

Tephritinae
Insects described in 1941
Diptera of South America